Meshgin Jiq (also Romanized as Meshgīn Jīq; also known as Meshkīn Jeq and Meshkīn Jīq) is a village in Ujan-e Sharqi Rural District, Tekmeh Dash District, Bostanabad County, East Azerbaijan Province, Iran. At the 2006 census, its population was 286, in 40 families.

References 

Populated places in Bostanabad County